Rulin Town is a town and the seat of Chengbu Miao Autonomous County in Hunan, China. As of the 2015 census it had a population of 75,900. It is surrounded by Maoping Town on the north, Dankou Town on the west, Lanrong Township on the east, and Tingping Township on the south.

The town of Rulin  has 25 villages and 11 communities under its jurisdiction.

Name
The name of the town is named after Rulin Academy, an academy of classical learning built by Yang Zaicheng in 1313 during the Yuan dynasty (1271–1368).

History
The town of Rulin is an ancient town. In the late period of Sui dynasty (about 610s AD), the separatist leader Xiao Xian created Jian Prefecture, as a county of the prefecture, Wuyou County was formed and its seat was located in the place of modern Rulin Town. The county of Wuyou was renamed to Wugang which was a part of Nanliang Prefecture in 621 AD. The county seat of Wugang was transferred to the modern downtown area of Wugang in early Song dynasty, the place of its former seat was named as Stockaded Village of Chengbu.

The county of Chengbu was formed from parts of two counties of Wugang and Suining in 1504, it was named after its seat of Chengbuzhai (meaning "Stockaded Village of Chengbu"). Rulin Town was established in 1950, it was reorganized as a commune and a town in 1961.

Administrative division
The town of Ruling has 11 communities and 25 villages under its jurisdiction (as of 2016).
11 communities

 Bajiaoting Community
 Bajuwei Community
 Chengbei Community
 Chengdong Community
 Chengnan Community
 Donghai Community
 Nanqiao Community
 Shibanqiao Community
 Xintian Community
 Yunma Community
 Zhongxin Community

25 villages

 Bailiaozhou Village
 Baiyunhu Village
 Chengxi Village
 Daqiao Village
 Ganxi Village
 Jiangping Village
 Jinshui Village
 Lanteng Village
 Lengshuiping Village
 Longfengchong Village
 Luojiashui Village
 Miaoling Village
 Nanmen Village
 Nanmu Village
 Panshi Village
 Qingxi Village
 Shiyang Village
 Shuanging Village
 Shuangxiqiao Village
 Taxi Village
 Tiantang Village
 Xinjianshui Village
 Yangjiajiang Village
 Yupin Village
 Zhuangjia Village

Geography
The town is located in the middle of Chengbu Miao Autonomous County.

The Wushui River winds through the town.

The town is in the central subtropical monsoon climate. It has four distinct seasons and abundant rainfall. Winter is warm and summer is cold.

Demographics
In December 2015, the town had an estimated population of 75,900 and a population density of 244 persons per km2. Miao people is the dominant ethnic group in the town, accounting for 48,700, accounting for 64.16%. There are also 12 ethnic groups, such as Dong, Hui, Tujia, and Yao. Among them, there are 15,200 Han people (20.03%), 4,100 Dong (5.40%), and 2,500 Hui people (3.29%).

Economy
The local economy is primarily based upon agriculture and local industry.

Transport
The Provincial Highway S219 is a north-south highway passing through the town's commercial and industrial areas.

References

Bibliography
 

Chengbu Miao Autonomous County
County seats in Hunan